Allsvenskan 2007, part of the 2007 Swedish football season, was the 83rd Allsvenskan season played. The first match was played 6 April 2007 and the last match was played 28 October 2007. IFK Göteborg won the league ahead of runners-up Kalmar FF, while IF Brommapojkarna were relegated.

Participating clubs

League table

Results

Season statistics

Top scorers

Scoring
Biggest Win (9 goals) – Helsingborgs IF 9–0 Halmstads BK
Highest Scoring Match (9 goals) – Helsingborgs IF 9–0 Halmstads BK

Overall
Most Wins – Kalmar FF (15)
Fewest Wins – Trelleborgs FF and IF Brommapojkarna (5)
Most Losses – Örebro SK, Trelleborgs FF and IF Brommapojkarna (13)
Fewest Losses – IFK Göteborg (5)
Most Goals Scored – Helsingborgs IF (49)
Fewest Goals Scored – IF Brommapojkarna (21)
Most Goals Conceded – Örebro SK (45)
Fewest Goals Conceded – IFK Göteborg (23)

Home
Most Wins – Djurgårdens IF and Hammarby IF (9)
Fewest Wins – Trelleborgs FF (3)
Most Losses – IF Brommapojkarna (6)
Fewest Losses – IFK Göteborg, IF Elfsborg and Gefle IF (2)
Most Goals Scored – Helsingborgs IF (33)
Fewest Goals Scored – IF Brommapojkarna (12)
Most Goals Conceded – Örebro SK (23)
Fewest Goals Conceded – AIK (8)

Away
Most Wins – IFK Göteborg (8)
Fewest Wins – Örebro SK and IF Brommapojkarna (1)
Most Losses – Hammarby IF, Gefle IF, Örebro SK and Trelleborgs FF (8)
Fewest Losses – IFK Göteborg and Djurgårdens IF (3)
Most Goals Scored – IFK Göteborg (26)
Fewest Goals Scored – Trelleborgs FF (7)
Most Goals Conceded – IF Brommapojkarna (26)
Fewest Goals Conceded – Djurgårdens IF (12)

Attendances

References 

Online

Notes

External links

Allsvenskan seasons
Swed
Swed
1